Castaic (Chumash: Kaštiq; Spanish: Castéc) is an unincorporated community in the northwestern part of Los Angeles County, California. As of the 2010 census it had a population of 19,015. For statistical purposes the Census Bureau has defined Castaic as a census-designated place (CDP).

Tens of thousands of motorists pass through Castaic daily as they drive to or from Los Angeles on Interstate 5 (the Golden State Freeway). Castaic Lake is part of the California Water Project and is the site of a hydro-electric power plant.

The Castaic Range War went on for decades in the late 19th and early 20th centuries resulting in dozens of deaths before hostilities ceased in 1916.

Name
The name is derived from the Chumash word Kaštiq, meaning "the eye". The Spanish and Mexicans later spelt the name in Spanish as Castéc. Castec is first mentioned on old boundary maps of Rancho San Francisco, as a canyon at the trailhead leading to the old Chumash camp at Castac Lake (Tejon Ranch), which is intermittently wet and briny. Early publications in English spelled it Casteque before the current spelling became standardized.

History
The Córdova family of California were the first settlers in the area. Modern Castaic began in 1887 when Southern Pacific set up a railroad siding on the line between Piru and Saugus Station, naming it "Castaic Junction". Between January and April 1890, the Castec School District adopted the new spelling, "Castaic".

Range War

Between 1890 and 1916, the Castaic Range War was fought in Castaic country over ranch boundaries and grazing rights. It was the biggest range war in U.S. history.

A feud started over Section 23, where the Stonegate subdivision is now. William Chormicle had legally bought the property, but William "Wirt" Jenkins was already storing grain on it and said he had filed for ownership. During a heated dispute, Chormicle and a friend shot and killed two of Jenkins's cowhands. They were acquitted in court.

Jenkins, however, was the local justice of the peace, with friends of his own, and the feud quickly grew into war. Former Los Angeles Rangers (among whom Jenkins had fought) and other notables were drawn in. The war claimed dozens of lives and foiled a negotiator, a forest ranger whom President Theodore Roosevelt had sent in to quell it.

Cattle business
Castaic has the last traditional cattle roundup—with horses, lariats, and branding irons—in Los Angeles County. It has been held by the Cordova family since 1834, when the family first settled here. Members of the Cordova family were scouts for the U.S. Army during the Mexican War in 1846 and helped identify bodies during the St. Francis Dam disaster in San Francisquito Canyon in 1928.

Geography

Seismology

The area is seismically active.

Climate
This region experiences hot and dry summers, and cool, moderately rainy winters. During the months of June though September, the average high temperature ranges from the 90s F (30s C) to above . According to the Köppen Climate Classification system, Castaic has a hot-summer Mediterranean climate, abbreviated "Csa" on climate maps.

Demographics

The 2010 United States Census reported that Castaic had a population of 19,015. The racial makeup of Castaic was 13,607 (71.6%) White (57.1% Non-Hispanic White), 630 (3.3%) African American, 119 (0.6%) Native American, 2,162 (11.4%) Asian, 26 (0.1%) Pacific Islander, 1,466 (7.7%) from other races, and 1,005 (5.3%) from two or more races. Hispanic or Latino of any race were 4,716 persons (24.8%).

The Census reported that 18,946 people (99.6% of the population) lived in households, 69 (0.4%) lived in non-institutionalized group quarters, and 0 (0%) were institutionalized.

According to the 2010 United States Census, Castaic had a median household income of $106,538, with 7.0% of the population living below the federal poverty line. The population was spread out in age, with 5,761 people (30.3%) under the age of 18, 1,717 people (9.0%) aged 18 to 24, 5,144 people (27.1%) aged 25 to 44, 5,302 people (27.9%) aged 45 to 64, and 1,091 people (5.7%) who were 65 years of age or older.  The median age was 35.6 years. For every 100 females, there were 101.2 males.  For every 100 females age 18 and over, there were 99.8 males.

The homeowner vacancy rate was 1.2%; the rental vacancy rate was 6.7%.  16,231 people (85.4% of the population) lived in owner-occupied housing units and 2,715 people (14.3%) lived in rental housing units.

Education
Elementary and middle school students attend schools in the Castaic Union School District. High school students attend Castaic High School in the William S. Hart Union High School District. Castaic High School first opened in 2019.

Government and infrastructure

The Los Angeles County Sheriff's Department (LASD) operates the Santa Clarita Valley Station in Santa Clarita, serving Castaic. Station 149 of the Los Angeles County Fire Department serves the community. The Castaic Area Town Council meets monthly.

Notable people
 Troy Neiman, baseball player

Appearances in popular culture
The community was featured by Huell Howser in The Bench Episode 19.

See also

 List of places in California

References

External links

 Castaic Area Town Council
 How to Pronounce Castaic (crowd-sourced)

1915 establishments in California
Census-designated places in California
Census-designated places in Los Angeles County, California
Populated places established in 1915